Jessica Mundy (born 20 September 1994) is an Australian professional racing cyclist.

Major results

2015
 Oceania Road Championships
1st  Under-23 road race
6th Road race
2016
 2nd  Road race, Oceania Road Championships

See also

References

External links

1994 births
Living people
Australian female cyclists
Place of birth missing (living people)